Goldfield is an unincorporated community and a census-designated place (CDP) located in and governed by Teller County, Colorado, United States. The CDP is a part of the Colorado Springs, CO Metropolitan Statistical Area. The population of the Goldfield CDP was 49 at the United States Census 2010. The Cripple Creek post office  serves the area.

History
The Goldfield post office was established in 1895, and remained in operation until 1932. The community was named for a gold mine near the original town site.

Geography

Demographics

See also

Outline of Colorado
Index of Colorado-related articles
State of Colorado
Colorado cities and towns
Colorado census designated places
Colorado counties
Teller County, Colorado
Colorado metropolitan areas
Front Range Urban Corridor
South Central Colorado Urban Area
Colorado Springs, CO Metropolitan Statistical Area

References

External links

History of Goldfield
Goldfield @ WesternMiningHistory.com
Goldfield @ GhostTowns.com
Goldfield City Hall & Fire Station
Goldfield, Colorado Mining Claims And Mines
Teller County website

Census-designated places in Teller County, Colorado
Census-designated places in Colorado
1895 establishments in Colorado